Megasurcula tremperiana is an extinct species of sea snail, a marine gastropod mollusk in the family Pseudomelatomidae, the turrids and allies.

Distribution
Fossils of this marine species have been found in Miocene strata in Venezuela.

References

 Landau, Bernard M., et al. "Systematics of the gastropods of the Lower–Middle Miocene Cantaure Formation, Paraguaná Peninsula, Venezuela." Bulletins of American Paleontology 389.390 (2016): 1-582.

centroamericana
Gastropods described in 2016